Hudnall is an English surname. Notable people with the surname include:

George Hudnall (1864–1937), American politician
James D. Hudnall (1957–2019), American writer 

English-language surnames